Shaher Abdulhak (1938 – 2 October 2020) was a Yemeni businessman.

Career
In 1963 Abdulhak founded the company "Shaher Trading", an enterprise involved in petroleum, soft drinks, tourism and property. Abdulhak was known as the "King of Sugar" in Yemen, where he held a great deal of political influence In spite of his prominent position in Yemeni society, Abdulhak was media-shy; he never granted interviews and no photo of him was ever printed in the local press. In December 2009, his picture was shown for the first time in public media when Norwegian newspaper VG printed a private photograph of him.

Shaher Abdulhaq was the father of Farouk Abdulhak, the alleged perpetrator of the rape and murder of the 23-year-old Norwegian female business student Martine Vik Magnussen. (See Murder of Martine Vik Magnussen.)

On 2 October 2020, Abdulhaq died from cancer in Germany. On 6 October, he was buried in Cairo, Egypt.

The impact of his son's legal problems on Shaher Abdulhak's business relationships
In December 2010, VG reported that a group of elected representatives in the Norwegian Parliament has written to Shaher Abdulhak's business connections, including Coca-Cola, Mercedes Benz-manufacturer Daimler AG, Whirlpool, Philips, Xerox and Clorox, requesting they review their commercial relationships. On 16 December 2010, VG confirmed that Daimler AG had served notice  to terminate its distribution contract with United Engineering & Automobile Co. Ltd. On 15 February 2011 a letter to the elected representatives from Abdulhak was published by Norwegian media, allegedly threatening the representatives with legal action.

References

2020 deaths
Yemeni billionaires
20th-century Yemeni businesspeople
21st-century Yemeni businesspeople
Deaths from cancer in Germany
People from Taiz
1938 births
Burials in Egypt